is a Japanese manga series written and illustrated by Masahito Soda. It was serialized in Shogakukan's Weekly Shōnen Sunday from September 1995 to June 1999. The manga has been licensed in North America by Viz Media.

An anime film produced by Sunrise was released in July 1999. A Japanese television drama was broadcast on Fuji Television in 2004. A manga sequel, titled Megumi no Daigo: Kyūkoku no Orange, began in Kodansha's Monthly Shōnen Magazine in October 2020. An anime television series adaptation of Megumi no Daigo: Kyūkoku no Orange, produced by Brain's Base, is set to premiere in Q4 2023.

As of August 2022, the manga had over 14 million in circulation. In 1996, Daigo of Fire Company M won the 42nd Shogakukan Manga Award in the shōnen category.

Plot
As a child, Daigo Asahina's life was saved by a fireman. He grew up and never forgot the brave, nameless man who rescued and inspired him to become a firefighter himself. Now as a firefighter in training at Medaka-Ga-Hama Fire Station in Sengoku City, Daigo must grow up quickly, learn the ropes, and find out if he truly has what it takes to become a heroic fireman.

Characters

An 18-year-old young man who thinks he knows everything about firefighting.

The captain of Fire Company M whose easy-going attitude is initially off-putting to the overzealous Daigo.

Daigo's high school teacher who continues to offer encouragement even though he is no longer her student. She treats him as though he is her little brother, though Daigo has feelings for her.

Daigo's serious-minded rival at Kujiradai Fire Station, one of the busiest stations in the area.

Kyūkoku no Orange

Media

Manga
Written and illustrated by Masahito Soda, Firefighter! Daigo of Fire Company M was serialized in Shogakukan's shōnen manga magazine Weekly Shōnen Sunday from September 6, 1995, to June 16, 1999. Shogakukan collected its chapters in twenty tankōbon volumes, released from January 18, 1996, to August 7, 1999. Shogakukan republished the series into eleven bunkoban volumes from October 4, 2005, to May 13, 2006.

In North America, Viz Media licensed the manga for English language release. The twenty volumes were released from December 10, 2002, to November 13, 2007. In December 2013, Viz Media published the series digitally on their platform.

In September 2020, the October issue of Kodansha's Monthly Shōnen Magazine revealed that a new manga series, titled , would start in the November 2020 issue of the magazine, published on October 6, 2020. Soda returned to the series with Kuro Tomiyama serving as his assistant. Kodansha released its first tankōbon volume on April 16, 2021. As of December 15, 2022, six volumes have been released.

Volume list

Megumi no Daigo: Kyūkoku no Orange

Anime
An anime film produced by Sunrise premiered on July 27, 1999.

An anime television series adaptation of Megumi no Daigo: Kyūkoku no Orange was announced on December 15, 2022. It is produced by Brain's Base and directed by Masahiko Murata, with scripts supervised by Shinzō Fujita, and character designs handled by Hitomi Tsuruta and Koji Yabuno. The series is set to premiere in Q4 2023.

Drama
A 11-episode Japanese television drama was broadcast on Fuji TV from January 6 to March 16, 2004.

Reception
As of August 2022, the manga had over 14 million in circulation.

In 1996, Daigo of Fire Company M won the 42nd Shogakukan Manga Award in the shōnen category. The series won an Excellence Award at the 2nd Japan Media Arts Festival in 1998.

References

External links
  
 

1995 manga
1999 anime films
2004 Japanese television series debuts
2004 Japanese television series endings
2023 anime television series debuts
Brain's Base
Drama anime and manga
Films about firefighting
Fuji TV dramas
Kodansha manga
Shogakukan franchises
Shogakukan manga
Shōnen manga
Sunrise (company)
Thriller anime and manga
Upcoming anime television series
Viz Media manga
Winners of the Shogakukan Manga Award for shōnen manga